Mark Anthony Eichhorn (born November 21, 1960) is a retired Major League Baseball pitcher best known for his tenure with the Toronto Blue Jays in the late 1980s and the early 1990s when he often served as a middle reliever/set-up man for All-Star closer Tom Henke. He was the 1986 American League Rookie Pitcher of the Year for the Blue Jays, a campaign in which he set team records for rookie relief in ERA, games, wins, and strikeouts.

Career
Eichhorn made his major league debut with the Blue Jays in 1982 but suffered a severe shoulder injury after which he did not return to the majors until 1986. The shoulder injury had robbed Eichhorn of most of his fastball velocity and had forced him to turn to an unconventional sidearm motion in which his arm angle was well below the belt when he released the ball. Eichhorn was notable for an exceptionally low velocity for a major league pitcher though his control and unusual delivery made him an effective player.

In his first year of the new pitching style, 1986, he was the easy American League ERA leader with 1.78, .70 ahead of winner Roger Clemens, but fell 5 innings pitched short of qualifying for the award.  Coach Jimy Williams offered him a chance to make those 5 innings with a start at the end of the season, but Eichhorn declined.

Eichhorn pitched with four different ballclubs during his career: the Toronto Blue Jays (1982, 1986–1988, 1992–1993), Atlanta Braves (1989), California Angels (1990–1992, 1996), and Baltimore Orioles (1994). Eichhorn appeared in his final game on September 14, 1996.

Eichorn was a solid fielding pitcher in his 11-year major league career, posting a .992 fielding percentage, committing only two errors in 243 total chances over 885.2 innings and 563 games. His only miscues occurred on August 19, 1987, against the Oakland A's and on July 4, 1992, against the Toronto Blue Jays.

Eichhorn is currently the pitching coach for Aptos High School in Aptos, California.

Children
Mark coached his 12-year-old son, Kevin, on the Aptos Little League team which won the Little League West Regional and played in the Little League World Series in Williamsport, Pennsylvania, in 2002, as chronicled in the movie Small Ball.

Kevin was later drafted in the third round, 104th overall, by the Arizona Diamondbacks in the 2008 MLB Draft, deciding to sign instead of attending Santa Clara University, where he had been committed since his junior year of high school.

On January 24, 2011, Kevin was traded to the Detroit Tigers organization in a deal for pitcher Armando Galarraga, pitching through the 2014 season, finishing with a career mark of 26-23 and a 3.73 ERA in 89 games.

Mark has five children, four sons and one daughter. Kevin (1990), Brian (1991), Steven (1995), Sarah (1999), and David (2001).

References

External links
, or Retrosheet
Pelota Binaria (Venezuelan Winter League)

1960 births
Living people
American expatriate baseball players in Canada
Atlanta Braves players
Baltimore Orioles players
Baseball players from San Jose, California
Cabrillo Seahawks baseball players
California Angels players
Cardenales de Lara players
American expatriate baseball players in Venezuela
Dunedin Blue Jays players
Durham Bulls players
Kinston Eagles players
Knoxville Blue Jays players
Lake Elsinore Storm players
Major League Baseball pitchers
Medicine Hat Blue Jays players
People from Aptos, California
Richmond Braves players
Syracuse Chiefs players
Toronto Blue Jays players